The Wanted 18 is a 2014 Palestinian-Canadian animated documentary about the efforts of Palestinians in Beit Sahour to start a small local dairy industry during the First Intifada, hiding a herd of 18 dairy cows from Israeli security forces when the dairy collective was deemed a threat to Israel's national security. The film combines documentary interviews with those involved in the events, archival footage, drawings, black-and-white stop-motion animation as well as re-enactments, and was co-directed by Canadian filmmaker Paul Cowan and Palestinian visual artist and director Amer Shomali. The film was the Palestinian entry for the Best Foreign Language Film at the 88th Academy Awards but was not nominated.

Background
In the 1980s, as part of a Palestinian boycott of Israeli taxation and commodities, residents of Beit Sahour decided to form a collective and stop purchasing milk from Israeli companies, in a quest for greater self-sufficiency. They purchased cows from a sympathetic kibbutznik and set about teaching themselves how to care for the animals and milk them—even sending a member to the United States to learn dairy farming. The farm was a success, with strong local demand for “Intifada milk.” However, the herd was declared a “threat to the national security of the state of Israel” and Israel sought to impound the cows, forcing Palestinians to devise ways to keep them hidden.

Animated sequences and visual style 

The film is framed as being told from the point of view of the cows—Rikva, Ruth, Lola and Goldie, who appear in humorous Claymation animated sequences. The filmmakers intended The Wanted 18 to have a comic book feel, even shooting live-action interviews at an angle to replicate the look of comic book panels. The director intended to use the cows point-of-view as a way for audience to sympathize with the subject matter. For Shomali, laughter is a way of non-violent disobedience.

Production
The idea for the film began in Shomali's boyhood, spent largely at a Syrian refugee camp where his main escape had been reading comic books, one of which dealt with the story of the Beit Sahour cows. Montreal-based producer Ina Fichman first heard of the story when a group of producers and broadcasters at a documentary-pitch event Ramallah. Shomali's original intention had been to make a short animated film on the story. However, Fichman believed it had the makings of a feature documentary and approached veteran Montreal-based documentary filmmaker Paul Cowan. The project took nearly five years to complete—a lengthy process due to the time involved in creating the animation as well as the fact that Shomali and his Canadian collaborators lived thousands of miles apart.

Interviewed in the film are Jalal Oumsieh, a schoolteacher who had purchased the 18 cows, geology professor Jad Ishad, pharmacist Elias Rishmawi and butcher Virginia Saad. The film also interviews two members of the Israeli government: Shaltiel Lavie, then-military governor of the region, and Ehud Zrahiya, his Arab affairs adviser.

The film score is composed by Benoît Charest. The Wanted 18 is a co-production of Intuitive Pictures, the National Film Board of Canada, Bellota Films, Dar Films Productions, ARTE and 2M (see credits-end of documentary). The producers are Fichman and Nathalie Cloutier. The film  received funding from the Beirut-based Arab Fund for Arts and Culture (AFAC). and from SANAD, Abu Dhabi film festival.

Release
The film had its world premiere at the 2014 Toronto International Film Festival and was screened to a capacity crowd in Ramallah. Other festival screenings as of the fall of 2014 include the Abu Dhabi Film Festival, where the film received the award for Best Documentary from the Arab World, the Rencontres internationales du documentaire de Montréal, as well as the 2014 Carthage Film Festival, where the film received its Golden tanit for best documentary film. In 2015, it  won Traverse City Film Festival Best Documentary award.

Controversy
The film's director Amer Shomali was unable to attend a screening of the film at the Human Rights Watch International Film Festival in New York City when he was denied entry to Jerusalem by the Israeli government on the grounds that he was a security threat, and was therefore unable to attain a U.S. Visa.

Reception
On review aggregator Rotten Tomatoes, the film holds an approval rating of 69% based on 13 reviews, with an average rating of 5.86/10. On Metacritic, the film has a weighted average score of 59 out of 100, based on 6 critics, indicating "mixed or average reviews".

Accolades

See also
 List of submissions to the 88th Academy Awards for Best Foreign Language Film
 List of Palestinian submissions for the Academy Award for Best Foreign Language Film

References

External links

2014 films
2014 documentary films
Canadian animated documentary films
Documentary films about the Israeli–Palestinian conflict
Films directed by Paul Cowan
National Film Board of Canada documentaries
Clay animation films
Palestinian documentary films
Documentary films about agriculture
Dairy farming
Agriculture in the State of Palestine
Films about cattle
Palestinian animated films
Canadian animated feature films
2010s stop-motion animated films
2010s Canadian films